The 1993 Limerick Senior Hurling Championship was the 99th staging of the Limerick Senior Hurling Championship since its establishment by the Limerick County Board.

Kilmallock were the defending champions.

On 26 September 1993, Patrickswell won the championship after a 0–17 to 0–07 defeat of Adare in the final. It was their 13th championship title overall and their first title in three championship seasons.

Results

Final

References

Limerick Senior Hurling Championship
Limerick Senior Hurling Championship